I've Fallen For You (Chinese: 少主且慢行; pinyin: Shǎo zhǔ qiěmàn xíng) is a 2020 Chinese television series starring Yu Shuxin, Liu Yichang, Luo Mingjie, and Chen Haolan. The series is adapted from the novel Jin Xin Ji (锦心记) by Han Xuefei, and premiered on iQIYI with multi-languages subtitles on February 14, 2020.

The series is divided into two seasons, each season consists of 12 episodes, for a total of 24 episodes.

Synopsis 
The story follows Tian Sanqi (Yu Shuxin), a quirky female investigator who has a strange liking for performing autopsies. She begins her journey to find her true love, due to a childhood promise made to her by a little boy. She befriends different people on her journey, and accidentally chances upon a few crime cases that is related to her friend's disappearance years ago. Together with her new-found mates, they begin to unravel the new-found mystery and a shocking conspiracy that is 10 years in the making comes to light.

Cast 

 Yu Shuxin as Tian Sanqi
 Liu Yichang as Zhao Cuo
 Luo Mingjie as Bai Yifei
 Chen Haolan as He Ruoyao
 Liu Xun as He Zhen
 Zhang Yuankun as Li Jia
 Cao Mingyue as Duan Xuewei
Chen Yitong as young Duan Xuewei
Zhang Zimeng as He Jinxin
Lu Hanbiao as Zhao Quandui
Wang Wei as Wu Meng
Cui Yi as Nanny Ling

Original soundtrack

Production 
The series began filming on July 26 and lasted until September 21, 2019. Filming took place at Hengdian World Studios.

Awards and nominations

References 

2020 Chinese television series debuts
Chinese television series